Jetavana (Jethawanaramaya or Weluwanaramaya buddhist literature) was one of the most famous of the Buddhist monasteries or viharas in India (present-day Uttar Pradesh). It was the second vihara donated to Gautama Buddha after the Venuvana in Rajgir. The monastery was given to him by his chief male patron, Anathapindika.

Jetavana is located just outside the old city of Savatthi. There was also an important vihara named Jetavana in Sri Lanka.

Jetavana was the place where the Buddha gave the majority of his teachings and discourses, having stayed at Jetavana nineteen out of 45 vassas, more than in any other monastery. It is said that after the Migāramātupāsāda, a second vihara erected at Pubbarama close to Savatthi was built by the Buddha's chief female lay disciple, Visakha, the Buddha would dwell alternately between Jetavana and Migāramātupāsāda, often spending the day in one and the night in the other (SNA.i.336).

Donation of Jetavana

Following Anathapindika's first encounter with the Buddha, he requested to offer him a meal, which the Buddha accepted, and then asked to build a temple for him and his monks in his hometown of Savatthi, to which the Buddha agreed.

Shortly after, Anathapindika went back to Savatthi to search for a place to build the monastery. Looking for a place that was both accessible to followers and peacefully secluded, he came across a park belonging to Prince Jeta, the son of King Pasenadi of Kosala. Anathapindika offered to buy the park from the prince but the prince refused, after Anathapindika persisted, the prince joking said he will sell him the park if he covers it with gold coins, to which Anathapindika agreed.

Anathapindika later came back with wagons full of gold pieces to cover the park with. When Prince Jeta stated that he was merely joking and still would not sell the park, Anathapindika and the prince went to arbitrators who concluded that Prince Jeta had to sell the park at the mentioned price.

The money brought in the first journey was found insufficient to cover one small spot near the gateway. So Anāthapindika sent his servants back for more, but Jeta, inspired by Anāthapindika's earnestness, asked to be allowed to give this spot. Anāthapindika agreed and Jeta erected there a gateway, with a room over it. Anāthapindika built in the grounds dwelling rooms, retiring rooms, store rooms and service halls, halls with fireplaces, closets, cloisters, halls for exercise, wells, bathrooms, ponds, open and roofed sheds, etc. (Vin.ii.158f).

It is said (MA.i.50; UdA.56f) that Anāthapindika paid eighteen crores for the purchase of the site, all of which Jeta spent in the construction of the gateway gifted by him. (The gateway was evidently an imposing structure; see J.ii.216).

Jeta gave, besides, many valuable trees for timber. Anāthapindika himself spent fifty-four crores in connection with the purchase of the park and the buildings erected in it.

The ceremony of dedication was one of great splendour. Not only Anāthapindika himself, but his whole family took part: his son with five hundred other youths, his wife with five hundred other noble women, and his daughters Mahā Subhaddā and Cūla Subhaddā with five hundred other maidens. Anāthapindika was attended by five hundred bankers. The festivities in connection with the dedication lasted for nine months (J.i.92ff).

The vihāra is almost always referred to as Jetavane Anāthapindikassa ārāma (Pali, meaning: in Jeta Grove, Anathapindika's Monastery). The Commentaries (MA.ii.50; UdA.56f, etc.) say that this was deliberate (at the Buddha's own suggestion pp. 81–131; Beal: op. cit., ii.5 and Rockhill: p. 49), in order that the names of both earlier and later owners might be recorded and that people might be reminded of two men, both very generous in the cause of the Religion, so that others might follow their example. The vihāra is sometimes referred to as Jetārāma (E.g., Ap.i.400).

Description of ancient Jetavana

Inside Jetavana

Some of the chief buildings attached to the Jetavana are mentioned in the books by special names, viz., Mahāgandhakuti, Kaverimandalamāla, Kosambakuti and Candanamāla. SNA.ii.403. Other buildings are also mentioned - e.g., the Ambalakotthaka-āsanasālā (J.ii.246). According to Tibetan sources the vihāra was built according to a plan sent by the devas of Tusita and contained sixty large halls and sixty small. The Dulva (Vinaya-pitaka in Tibetan) also gives details of the decorative scheme of the vihāra (Rockhill: op. cit.48 and n.2).

All these were built by Anāthapindika; there was another large building erected by Pasenadi and called the Salalaghara (DA.ii.407). Over the gateway lived a guardian deity to prevent all evildoers from entering (SA.i.239). Just outside the monastery was a rajayatana tree, the residence of the god Samiddhisumana (Mhv.i.52f; MT 105; but see DhA.i.41, where the guardian of the gateway is called Sumana).

In the grounds there seems to have been a large pond which came to be called the Jetavanapokkharanī. (AA.i.264; here the Buddha often bathed (J.i.329ff.). Is this the Pubbakotthaka referred to at A.iii.345? But see S.v.220; it was near this pond that Devadatta was swallowed up in Avīci (J.iv.158)).

The grounds themselves were thickly covered with trees, giving the appearance of a wooded grove (arañña) (Sp.iii.532). On the outskirts of the monastery was a mango-grove (J.iii.137). In front of the gateway was the Bodhi-tree planted by Anāthapindika, which came later to be called the Anandabodhi (J.iv.228f). Not far from the gateway was a cave which became famous as the Kapallapūvapabbhāra on account of an incident connected with Macchariyakosiya (J.i.348).

According to the Divyāvadāna (Dvy.395f), the thūpas of Sāriputta and Moggallāna were in the grounds of Jetavana and existed until the time of Asoka. Both Fa Hien (Giles: p. 33ff) and Houien Thsang (Beal.ii.7ff) give descriptions of other incidents connected with the Buddha, which took place in the neighbourhood of Jetavana - e.g., the murder of Sundarikā, the calumny of Ciñcā, Devadatta's attempt to poison the Buddha, etc.

The Gandhakuti: Buddha's dwelling in Jetavana
The space covered by the four bedposts of the Buddha's Gandhakuti in Jetavana is one of the four avijahitatthānāni; all Buddhas possess the same, though the size of the actual vihāra differs in the case of the various Buddhas. For Vipassī Buddha, the setthi Punabbasumitta built a monastery extending for a whole league, while for Sikhī Buddha, the setthi Sirivaddha made one covering three gavutas. The Sanghārāma built by Sotthiya for Vessabhū Buddha was half a league in extent, while that erected by Accuta for Kakusandha Buddha covered only one gāvuta. The monastery of the Koṇāgamana Buddha, built by the setthi Ugga, extended for half a gāvuta, while that of the Kassapa Buddha built by Sumangala covered sixteen karīsas. Anāthapindika's monastery covered a space of eighteen karīsas (BuA.2, 47; J.i.94; DA.ii.424).

According to a description given by Faxian (Giles, pp. 31, 33), the vihāra was originally in seven sections (storeys?) and was filled with all kinds of offerings, embroidered banners, canopies, etc., and the lamps burnt from dusk to dawn.

One day a rat, holding in its mouth a lamp wick, set fire to the banners and canopies, and all the seven sections were entirely destroyed. The vihāra was later rebuilt in two sections. There were two main entrances, one on the east, one on the west, and Faxian found thūpas erected at all the places connected with the Buddha, each with its name inscribed.

Near Jetavana
Near Jetavana was evidently a monastery of rival teachers where Ciñcāmānavikā spent her nights as she was hatching her paternity-fraud smear campaign against the Buddha.

There seems to have been a playground just outside Jetavana used by the children of the neighbourhood, who, when thirsty, would go into Jetavana to drink (DhA.iii.492). The high road to Sāvatthi passed by the edge of Jetavana, and travellers would enter the park to rest and refresh themselves.

Discovery and current situation
The remains of Jetavana and Savatthi were locally known as Sahet-Mahet. Alexander Cunningham used the ancient (6th century AD) accounts of Chinese pilgrim-monks to determine that Sahet-Mahet actually referred to Jetavana and Savatthi.

Jetavana is currently a historical park, with remains of many ancient buildings such as monasteries, huts (such as the Gandhakuti and the Kosambakuti) and stupas. In Jetavana is also located the second-holiest tree of Buddhism: the Anandabodhi Tree. A visit to Savatthi and Jetavana is part of the Buddhist pilgrim route in North-India. The most revered place in Jetavana is the Gandhakuti, where Buddha used to stay.

Photo gallery

See also
Anathapindika
Kassapa Buddha
Koṇāgamana Buddha
Kakusandha Buddha
List of the twenty-eight Buddhas
Gion

References

Further reading
von Schroeder, Ulrich. 1990. Buddhist Sculptures of Sri Lanka. 752 pages with 1610 illustrations. Hong Kong: Visual Dharma Publications, Ltd.

External links

 Extracts from books on the subject of Jetavana
 Dedication ceremony of the Jetavana monastery by Anathapindika

Defunct Buddhist monasteries
Buddhist monasteries in India
Buddhist pilgrimage sites in India
Shravasti
Gion faith